Events in the year 2023 in Angola.

Incumbents 

 President: João Lourenço
 Vice President: Esperança da Costa

Events 
Ongoing — COVID-19 pandemic in Angola

 20 January - The Angola Central Bank cuts interest rates from 19% to 18.5%, the steepest cut since 2018.
 10 March - Angola announces that it will deploy troops to the Democratic Republic of the Congo, following the failure of a ceasefire between government forces and M23 rebels in North Kivu.

References 

 
2020s in Angola
Years of the 21st century in Angola
Angola
Angola